The Ligure was an international express train operated by the Italian Railways linking Milan with the Côte d'Azur. The train was named after the Italian region Liguria which was served by the train.

Trans Europ Express
The Ligure was planned to be one of the initial TEE services at the start of the network at 2 June 1957. However the rolling stock was late itself and the service couldn't start before 12 August 1957. Initially the service linked Milan with Marseille calling at several cities, as Genoa, Monaco and Nice and tourist resorts along the Mediterranean coast. The Aln 442-448 diesel multiple units attracted more and more passengers over the years and by 1966 the train was coupled with an Ale-840 on the Italian stretch to cope with the raising number of travellers.

In 1969 the route was prolonged further west to Avignon in order to provide a TEE link between Milan and Barcelona using the newly introduced TEE Catalan Talgo and the TEE Ligure. The timetable was changed in a way that passengers could change from the Catalan Talgo to the Ligure and vice versa in Avignon at around 3 p.m. The formation was changed as well to two Aln 442-448 coupled between Milan and  Nice.

Timetable in 1971  (France and Monaco are in Central European time zone, Italy at that time in the Eastern European time zone, the real travel time between Monaco and Ventimiglia is 17 minutes)

On 1 October 1972 the rolling stock was replaced by Gran Conforto coaches hauled by an electric locomotive class E 444.

Intercity 
On 22 May 1982 the route was shortened to Milan - Nice. At the same time 2nd-class coaches were introduced and the train was transformed into an Intercity service with 16 stops. It didn't met the EuroCity criteria and it lasted until 2005 before the EuroCity label was granted. In December 2009 the Ligure was withdrawn.

See also

 History of rail transport in France
 History of rail transport in Italy
 List of EuroCity services
 List of named passenger trains of Europe

References

Notes

Works cited

External links

EuroCity
International named passenger trains
Named passenger trains of France
Named passenger trains of Italy
Trans Europ Express
Railway services introduced in 1957
Railway services discontinued in 2009